Char Kukri-Mukri Wildlife Sanctuary is a wildlife sanctuary in southern Charfession Upazila of Bangladesh, located on Char Kukri Mukri island in the Bay of Bengal in the south of the country. It is 130 km from Barisal town in the gangetic delta on the mouth of Meghna river. It is also called Charfasson wildlife sanctuary. Most part of the sanctuary is submerged twice in a day due to high tide and is covered with dense mangrove vegetation. The soil type is clay.

Climate
The rainfall is very high during the monsoon season, the recorded rainfall is  round the year. The climate is hot and humid round the year. The sanctuary is dissected by 6 small Khals or creeks.

History
According to the local people the human habitation started on the island around 1930 during the British Raj. The Bhola cyclone which hit the Bangladesh in 1970 had swept the entire human population on the island. After the cyclone, in the year 1973/1974 people again migrated to the island and started fishing and cultivation. Bangladesh forest department started afforestation of many mangrove species on the island.

Management
The park is managed by 1 Range officer and 1 forest beat  guard. It is administered by the Coastal Forest Division at Bhola.    It was declared as wildlife sanctuary on 19-12-1981 under the Bangladesh wildlife (Preservation) Amendment Act of 1947. No forestry activities is carried out in the mangrove forest except conservation activities.

Flora and fauna
The sanctuary has an esturine ecosystem; the sanctuary is covered with mangrove forest on the major part with intermittent open mudflats.

Flora
277 species of plants belonging to 76 families were identified from the sanctuary and on the island. These species include 91 tree species, 33 shrub species, 118 herbs and 35 climbers. The Mangrove species like (Sonneratia apetala),Baine (Avicennia officinalis), Geoa (Excoecaria agallocha), (Acanthus ilicifolius),Khalisha (Ageiceras maius) and Typha angustifolia are common.

Fauna
Common mammals include Fishing cat (Felis viverrina) and Oriental small-clawed otter (Aonyx cinerea). Water fowl species of Bitterns, Herons, Egrets, kingfishers are very common. Eight species of Herons breed in the sanctuary. The Grey Pelican or Spot-billed pelican which is included in the Near threatened species list of IUCN Red data Book is also found in this sanctuary.  All three species of Monitor lizard namely (Varanus salvator), Bengal monitor (Varanus bengalensis) and Yellow monitor (Varanus flavescens) are also found in the sanctuary.

Threats
The threats are encroachment for cultivation land and excessive fishing by the local people and invasion of the exotic foreign plant species.

See also

 List of protected areas of Bangladesh

References

National parks of Bangladesh
Forests of Bangladesh